Millhauser is a surname. Notable people with the surname include:

Bertram Millhauser (1892–1958), American screenwriter
Steven Millhauser (born 1943), American novelist and short story writer